The 1888 United States presidential election in Ohio was held on November 6, 1888 as part of the 1888 United States presidential election. State voters chose 23 electors to the Electoral College, who voted for president and vice president. 

Ohio was narrowly won by Republican Party candidate, Benjamin Harrison, with 49.51% of the popular vote. The Democratic Party candidate, incumbent President Grover Cleveland, garnered 47.18% of the popular vote.

Results

Results by county

See also
 United States presidential elections in Ohio

References

Ohio
1888
1888 Ohio elections